Mike Friedman was an American football coach.  He served as the head football coach at  Colorado State University Pueblo (CSU Pueblo) from 1974 to 1983.

Friedman's career at Pueblo came to an interesting end as he was caught doctoring game film that was supposed to be submitted to an upcoming opponent.

Head coaching record

References

Living people
University of Wisconsin–Eau Claire alumni
CSU Pueblo ThunderWolves football coaches
Year of birth missing (living people)